The Cappella San Donato is a small Roman Catholic church or oratory erected in 1500 in the town of Venafro, province of Isernia, region of Molise, Italy within the Diocese of Isernia-Venafro.

It was a site for morning prayers for the porcari (swineherdsmen), before they went out into the fields. It was closed during 1920–1942. Damaged during the war, it has not been re-opened.

See also
Catholic Church in Italy

References

Roman Catholic churches in Venafro
Roman Catholic churches completed in 1500
16th-century Roman Catholic church buildings in Italy
Roman Catholic chapels in Italy